Frederick John Nile (born 15 September 1934) is an Australian politician and ordained Christian minister. Nile has been a member of the New South Wales Legislative Council since 1981, except for a period in 2004. Nile was re-elected at the 1991, 1999, 2007, and 2015 state elections and served as the Assistant President of the Legislative Council between 2007 and 2019.

Nile was National President of the Christian Democratic Party, a conservative party which focused primarily on what it regarded as important moral and social issues. Nile is noted for his controversial comments. He is mainly known for his vocal opposition to drug use, abortion, pornography and homosexuality. He is patron of the Australian Christian Nation Association and Vice President of the Australian Christian Endeavour Union, an evangelical youth movement. He is the longest-serving member of the New South Wales Parliament.

Early life
Nile was born in Kings Cross, New South Wales and was educated at Mascot Public and Cleveland Street High School (1940–1949). In 1952, during the Korean War, at age 17, Nile volunteered to join the National Service in 1952 and then transferred to the CMF/reserves which allowed him to avoid deployment to Korea and qualified for the rank of major, before retiring in 1972. In 1958, Nile married Elaine Crealy, who was a member of the Legislative Council for 14 years. They had three sons and a daughter. Elaine died in October 2011 at age 75. Nile attended the NSW Congregational Theological College, the NSW United Faculty of Theology and the University of New England. He was awarded a Licentiate of Theology by the Melbourne College of Divinity.

Early career

Nile was ordained as a Congregational minister in 1964. From 1964 to 1967, he was National Director of the Australian Christian Endeavour Movement, a Protestant youth leadership training organisation. In 1967–68, he was assistant director of the Billy Graham Crusade in Sydney before being employed as director of the Congregational Board of Evangelism in New South Wales. In 1970–71, he was involved in social work as director of the Methodist Mission to the People of New South Wales and, from 1971 to 1973, was Director of Outreach and Evangelism, Sydney City Wesley Central Methodist Mission.

In 1974, Nile was elected national co-ordinator and the New South Wales director of the Australian Federation of Festival of Light – Community Standards Organisation (FOL–CSO), an organisation which campaigned "for purity, love and family life".

Political career

Nile was elected to the New South Wales Legislative Council on 19 September 1981 with 9.1% of the vote as the founder of the Call to Australia (Fred Nile) Group, established in 1977. Following the election to the Legislative Council of Jim Cameron (in 1984) and Nile's wife, Elaine (1988), the Call to Australia Group was officially recognised as a political party. Fred Nile was re-elected to the Council at the 1991 and 1999 state elections. Nile wrote his autobiography in 2001. In 2003, Nile resigned from the Uniting Church in Australia claiming that the church had "officially decided to part with a literal interpretation of the Judeo-Christian Bible".

Federal candidacy (2004)
Nile resigned from the NSW Parliament on 30 August 2004 in order to contest the 2004 Federal election, seeking a position in the Australian Senate on a platform of opposition of the recognition of gay marriages. Nile was the last candidate excluded after the distribution of votes on the 77th count, and was not elected to the Senate. A few months later, he was re-appointed to the Legislative Council to fill the vacancy created by his own resignation.

Return to state politics
At the 2007 New South Wales state election, Nile was re-elected for a further eight-year term and was appointed to the newly-created position of Assistant President of the NSW Legislative Council.

In 2007, he retired as the New South Wales director of the Australian Federation of Festival of Light. Nile served as the President of the Fellowship of Congregational Churches, a group of Australian Congregationalists who declined to join the Uniting Church in 1977, for the years 2007 to 2012, and again for the 2013/14 year.

In November 2009, he stated his decision to retire in 2015, but later announced his decision to accept the Christian Democratic Party (CDP) nomination for the NSW Legislative Council at the New South Wales State Election on 28 March 2015. In 2014, Nile announced that he will be contesting the next state election in 2015 with his deputy, Ross Clifford. In 2015, Nile supported the Liberal government's Privatization of the state's electricity poles and wires.

In January 2017, Nile was denied entry to the United States, where he had been invited to attend the inauguration of Donald Trump. He was later granted a visa and an apology, though no reason was given for the initial refusal.

In April 2021, Nile announced he would retire in November 2021, nominating Lyle Shelton to replace him. However, in September of that year he rescinded Shelton's endorsement and announced he would complete his term. In 2022, the Christian Democratic Party was dissolved. In May 2022, Fred Nile joined the Seniors United Party of Australia. The party was not registered with the NSW Electoral Commission and was deregistered with the AEC less than two months later. Nile renewed his retirement in October 2022, intending to give his final speech in parliament on 17 November.  In February 2023, Nile announced his intention to nominate for re-election.  Nile appears on the ballot second to his wife Silvana with no party affiliation as Group G. Having only two candidates, this group has no above-the-line voting square which experts consider to leave no prospect for election.

Controversies

Comments on the Lindt Cafe siege
In January 2015, Nile argued that male hostages who fled the Lindt Cafe siege should not receive bravery awards, as giving them one would "cheapen" it. He stated during an interview on Channel Seven's Sunrise program that no hostages at Martin Place should receive bravery awards and their actions had potentially risked the lives of their fellow hostages. "Usually men try to protect the women and it seems that the men were saving their own skin and leaving the women there." He later added that he mis-spoke when he said that "the only man inside the café had been the man holding the gun."

In a media release dated 14 January 2015, Nile stated, "I fully support Prime Minister Tony Abbott’s recommendation to the Governor General, Sir Peter Cosgrove, that Mrs Dawson and Mr Johnson should be honoured with posthumous bravery awards." He also recommended that proper consideration should be given to the actions of others involved, including other hostages and police.

Comments on homosexuality
Nile has been described by Buzzfeed as "one of Australia's longest-running anti-gay campaigners". He is opposed to homosexuality which he has described as a "mental disorder" and calls homosexuality a "lifestyle choice" that is "immoral, unnatural and abnormal". Nile has also stated that he was "totally opposed to the bashing of homosexuals ... totally opposed to any violence or attacks directed against homosexual men or lesbians ... opposed to strong (malicious) verbal attacks."

Nile has opposed the Sydney Gay and Lesbian Mardi Gras, which he described as a "public parade of immorality and blasphemy". Nile objected to the "indecency and obscenity in various parts of the Mardi Gras" and stated that it reinforced "the worst stereotypes". Each year, he leads a prayer session against the event.

In 2005, Nile called for the repealing of New South Wales anti-vilification law, claiming that the law is discriminatory and should either cover all citizens or be abolished. Nile claimed that the Homosexual Vilification Act was being abused to gag free speech and prevent open non-malicious public discussion.

Following a 2011 announcement by Penny Wong, a Labor Party federal government minister, that her same-sex partner was pregnant, Nile publicly denounced Wong's actions, saying "I'm totally against a baby being brought up by two mothers" and "She needn't have made it public. It just promotes their lesbian lifestyle and trying to make it natural where it's unnatural." During a televised debate on the show Q&A, Nile told Gene Robinson, the first priest in an openly gay relationship to be consecrated a bishop in a major Christian denomination, that he "should be ashamed to be a bishop and going against the church".

Nile used his newspaper, Family World News, to urge a no vote on the Australian Marriage Law Postal Survey.

Comments on the Australian Greens
Nile is a frequent critic of the Australian Greens, claiming that they have exploited genuine concern for the environment to garner political influence to "push their agenda of social engineering". Nile has criticised the Greens for what he calls "duplicite political expediency", citing their push to legalise and fund "illicit drug habits for addicts" such as heroin and cannabis in what he claims is contravention of publicised Greens policy. Nile has also labelled the Greens as being "anti-family", "anti-Christian", and "pagan", citing what he believes to be pro-pornography and pro-sex industry policies and their opposition to the current practice of opening parliament with daily prayers.

Nile once described the Greens as the "watermelon party – green on the outside but red on the inside, with a bit of a pink tinge."

Comments on Muslims and neo-pagans

Following the Moscow theatre hostage crisis in 2002, Nile asked whether the then state minister of police would consider banning full body coverings, like those worn by the Chechen terrorists, from parliament and places of public gathering to prevent the carriage of weapons or explosive devices. Nile has attempted to pass bills in the NSW Legislative Council that would prohibit the wearing of full-face coverings, such as the hijab or niqāb, six times – 2006, 2010, 2011, 2014, 2017, and 2019. Five of the bills failed to be passed, with only the latest bill still not lapsed.

On 10 March 2007, Nile raised concern that Australian embassy officials posted in Islamic nations were favouring the immigration of Muslim over Christian refugees. Nile called for a moratorium on Muslim immigration to Australia: "Australians deserve a breathing space so the situation can be carefully assessed", he told an audience in North Ryde.

In 2010, Nile asked for the removal of the then Australian Muslim leader Sheik Taj El-Din Hilaly after the sheik placed the blame for sexual assault on the female victims.

Nile is opposed to Australian neopagans, having said that the Christian Democrats would "do what it can to stop pagan weddings and witchcraft or Wicca activities."

Comparison of ethics classes to Nazism
Ethics classes were introduced by the Keneally Labor government as an alternative for children who did not want to attend traditional scripture classes. Prior to the 2011 state election, Barry O'Farrell made a pre-election pledge of not scrapping the ethics classes. Following the election, Nile, who was vehemently opposed to the ethics classes, introduced a private members bill proposing the abolition of the classes at the end of the 2011 calendar year. Debate on the bill was adjourned until 16 September; and eventually Nile was successful in pushing the government to establish a parliamentary inquiry to examine whether ethics classes in NSW schools should be abolished. Meanwhile, in introducing his bill into the Legislative Council, Nile gained headlines by arguing that the ethics course is based on a philosophy linked to Nazism and Communism.

Parliament activities
Nile served on the New South Wales' Parliamentary Standing Committee on Social Issues (1988–1995), facilitating legislative reforms on adoption laws, drug abuse among youth, rape rates and pornography, domestic violence, youth violence, youth rural suicides, compensation for medically acquired AIDS/HIV victims, juvenile justice, births, deaths and marriage records.

From 2007 to 2019, Nile served as the Assistant President of the New South Wales Legislative Council.

Nile has also served on the New South Wales' Parliamentary Standing Committee on Law and Justice, the New South Wales' Joint Parliamentary Select Committee on Electoral Reform, the Parliamentary Select Committee into Firearms, the Joint Parliamentary Select Committee into the Management of Parliament, as Chairman of the Cross City Tunnel Inquiry, Chairman of the General Purpose Standing Committee No. 1, Chairman of the Select Committee on Electoral and Political Party Funding and Chairman of the Joint Select Committee on the Royal North Shore Hospital among many others.

Nile currently serves as a member of the Standing Committee on Social Issues.

See also
 Congregational Federation of Australia
 List of people declared personae non gratae in Azerbaijan

Notes

References

Bibliography
 Fred Nile: A Biography Sydney: Strand: 2001:

External links
 Official website 
 Christian Democratic Party 
 Seniors United Party of Australia

1934 births
Australian Army soldiers
Living people
Christian Democratic Party (Australia) politicians
Spouses of Australian politicians
Politicians from Sydney
Australian monarchists
Australian anti-abortion activists
Christian critics of Islam
Australian critics of Islam
Australian anti-same-sex-marriage activists
Members of the New South Wales Legislative Council
Australian Congregationalist ministers
20th-century Congregationalist ministers
21st-century Australian politicians
20th-century Australian politicians
21st-century Congregationalist ministers